Indra Yasin (28 June 1954 – 3 March 2022) was an Indonesian politician. A member of Golkar, Nasdem, and lastly the United Development Party, he served as Regent of North Gorontalo from 2012 to 2022. He died in Gorontalo on 3 March 2022, at the age of 67.

References

1954 births
2022 deaths
Politicians from Gorontalo (province)
21st-century Indonesian politicians
Golkar politicians
Nasdem Party politicians
United Development Party politicians
Hasanuddin University alumni
People from Gorontalo (province)